The Uru–Chipaya family is an indigenous language family of Bolivia.

The speakers were originally fishermen on the shores of Lake Titicaca, Lake Poopó, and the Desaguadero River.

Chipaya has over a thousand speakers and sees vigorous use in the native community, but all other Uru languages or dialects are extinct.

Loukotka (1968) also lists the Chango language, once spoken on the coast of Chile from Huasco to Cobija in Antofagasta Province. The population has since been Araucanized.

Proposed external relationships

Stark (1972) proposed a Maya–Yunga–Chipayan macrofamily linking Mayan with Uru–Chipaya and Yunga (Mochica).

Language contact
Jolkesky (2016) notes that there are lexical similarities with the Kunza, Pukina, Pano, Jaqi, Kechua, Mapudungun, and Moseten-Tsimane language families due to contact.

Vocabulary
Loukotka (1968) lists the following basic vocabulary items for Uro (Uru) and Chipaya.

{| class="wikitable sortable"
! gloss !! Uro !! Chipaya
|-
! one
| sipi || shintal'a
|-
! two
| pisk'i || pishk
|-
! three
| chepe || chep
|-
! head
| ácha || acha
|-
! eye
| shukui || chuki
|-
! hand
| kárshi || kxara
|-
! woman
| túkũ || txuna
|-
! water
| koási || kuas
|-
! sun
| túñi || túñi
|-
! maize
| tura || tara
|}

Bibliography
Aguiló, F. (1986). El idioma de los Urus. Editora Centro Portales.
Cerrón-Palomino, R. (2011). Chipaya. Léxico y etnotaxonomía. Lima: PUCP.
Espinoza Soriano (1991). Proto-Takanan and Uru-Chipaya: genetic relationship or ancient loans? Comunicação apresentada em: Conferencia Internacional sobre Lenguaje, Política Oficial sobre el Lenguaje y Política Educativa en los Andes, 28–30 October 1991. Newark: University of Delaware.
Hannẞ, K. (2008). Uchumataqu: The lost language of the Urus of Bolivia. A grammatical description of the language as documented between 1894 and 1952 (ILLA, 7). Leiden: CNWS Publications.
Nimuendajú, K. (1928-1929). Wortliste der Šipáya-Indianer. Anthropos, 23:821-850, 24:863-896.
Snethlage, E. (1932). Chipaya- und Curuaya-Wörter. Anthropos, 27:65-93.
Vellard, J. A. (1949-1951). Contribution à l'étude des Indiens Uru ou Kot'suñs. Travaux de l'Institut Français d'études Andines, 1:145-209, 2:51-89, 3:3-39.

References

 
Language families
Uru
Indigenous languages of the Andes
Languages of Bolivia